Nod's Tacklebox o' Fun is a various artists compilation album released in 1999 by Re-Constriction Records.

Reception
Aiding & Abetting gave it a mixed review, saying "the same incoherent mix of covers (everything from "MMMBop" to "Ice Ice Baby" to "The Devil Went Down to Georgia" to "Diamonds are Forever"), the same sorts of bands. The same mixed results." Chris Best of Lollipop Magazine agreed, saying "while not great, the concept is fun and so are the covers." Ink 19 claimed that "this disc isn’t something that you'll listen to that much farther down the road, but for now, it’s certain to leave you in hysterics."

Track listing

Personnel
Adapted from the Nod's Tacklebox o' Fun liner notes.

 Josquin des Pres – mastering
 Jay Stephens – cover art

Release history

References

External links 
 

1999 compilation albums
Alternative rock compilation albums
Industrial rock compilation albums
Re-Constriction Records compilation albums